Rachel Sutton may refer to:

Rachel Sutton, character in Bitten (TV series)
Rachel Sutton, presenter on Classic Hits FM